Dimah Mil Sofla (also Romanized as Dīmah Mīl Soflá; also known as Dīmeh-ye Mīl-e Pā’īn) is a village in Bakesh-e Do Rural District, in the Central District of Mamasani County, Fars Province, Iran. At the 2006 census, its population was 126, in 28 families.

References 

Populated places in Mamasani County